The Weberg Formation is a geologic formation in Oregon. It preserves fossils dating back to the Jurassic period.

See also

 List of fossiliferous stratigraphic units in Oregon
 Paleontology in Oregon

References
 

Jurassic geology of Oregon